The Water Environment Federation (WEF) is a not-for-profit technical and educational organization of more than 34,000 individual members and 75 Member Associations (MAs) representing water quality professionals around the world. WEF, which was formerly known as the Federation of Sewage Works Associations and later as the Water Pollution Control Federation, and its members have protected public health and the environment since 1928. As a global water sector leader, the organization's mission is to connect water professionals; enrich the expertise of water professionals; increase the awareness of the impact and value of water; and provide a platform for water sector innovation. WEF members include experts and specialists in the fields of:
environmental engineering
industrial wastewater treatment
sewage treatment and sewage sludge treatment
stormwater management
water quality analysis and planning
and related disciplines.

WEF is headquartered in Alexandria, Virginia, United States.

Publications and Conferences 
In addition to books, technical reports, and conferences proceedings, WEF publishes the peer-reviewed journal, Water Environment Research, and the magazine, Water Environment Technology. WEF sponsors local and national speciality meetings, as well as the world's largest annual water conference: WEFTEC - Water Environment Federation Technical Exposition and Conference.

Awards 
To recognize individuals and groups in a number of areas, WEF sponsors awards in the categories of: Published Papers; Operational and Design Excellence; Education; Individual Service and Contribution; Fellows; Organization and Association Recognition; National Municipal Stormwater and Green Infrastructure, as well as Committee Chair Service Appreciation.

See also
National Association of Clean Water Agencies (NACWA) - U.S. local government sewage treatment agencies
Water supply and sanitation in the United States

References

External links
 

American engineering organizations
Environmental engineering
Non-profit organizations based in Alexandria, Virginia
Water pollution in the United States
International water associations
Supraorganizations